Vanadzor State University Futsal Club, shortly known as VSU Futsal, is an Armenian professional futsal club based in Vanadzor, representing the Vanadzor State University.

History
Vanadzor State University Futsal Club was formed in 2015 by the Vanadzor University through the efforts of its current students, alumni and a group of professional futsal players from Lori Province. The team participates in the Armenian Futsal Premier League since the 2015-16 season, playing their home games at the Armenia Sports Arena of Vanadzor.

Season by season

References

VSU
Sport in Vanadzor
2015 establishments in Armenia
Futsal clubs established in 2015